The Taiwan Dancer TD-3 is a Taiwanese amateur-built aircraft produced by Taiwan Dancer Technology Co. of Nangang Village, Dayuan District, Taoyuan City. Designed by Chin Lien Wei, the aircraft is supplied as a kit for amateur construction.

By May 2017 the company website had been taken down and the company may have ceased operations.

Design and development
The aircraft features a strut-braced high-wing, a two-seats-in-side-by-side configuration enclosed cockpit with doors for access, fixed tricycle landing gear or conventional landing gear and a single engine in tractor configuration.

The aircraft fuselage is made from welded steel tubing while the wing is made from aluminum sheet parts, with all surfaces covered in formed epoxy polymer. The wings can be folded in 15 minutes for ground transportation or storage.

The TD-3 was completed in 2007 and won first prize for an aircraft design, awarded by the Taiwanese Ministry of Economic Affairs.

Specifications (TD-3)

References

External links

Homebuilt aircraft
Single-engined tractor aircraft
Taiwan Dancer aircraft